Cesare Maria De Vecchi, 1st Conte di Val Cismon (14 November 1884 – 23 June 1959) was an Italian soldier, colonial administrator and Fascist politician.

Biography

De Vecchi was born in Casale Monferrato on 14 November 1884. After graduating in jurisprudence he became a successful lawyer in Turin. His stance on the First World War was interventionist, and he himself took part in the final events of the conflict, finishing the war with the rank of captain and various decorations for valor. On his return to Italy he gave his support to the National Fascist Party, in which he would consistently represent the monarchical and 'moderate' wing. He became president of the Turin war veterans and head of the local Fascist squadre. In 1921, he was elected to the Italian Chamber of Deputies.

De Vecchi became Commander General of the Milizia (see Blackshirts), was one of the quadrumvirs who organised the March on Rome, and sought to persuade Antonio Salandra to enter into Benito Mussolini's government. He himself became Undersecretary at the Treasury and then at the Finance Ministry. In December 1922 he inspired the squadre of Brandimarte to the 1922 Turin massacre (Strage di Torino) and he became known as the most important of the Piedmontese squadristi.

From 1923 to 1928, De Vecchi was governor of Italian Somaliland, a role which took him away from the centre of the Italian political scene. He was made Count of Val Cismon (in memory of the battles fought by his arditi on Monte Grappa in 1918). He was appointed a Senator by King Victor Emmanuel III. He became the first ambassador to the Vatican after the Concordat of 1929. 
During the 1939s he chaired the Piedmont Committee for the History of Risorgimento, organized eventi and lectured to celebrate the period.

Between 1935 and 1936 he was national Minister of Education: as such he promoted a historiography which identified the House of Savoy as the link between Imperial Rome and the Rome of Fascism, and also worked for the centralisation of the administration of the school system. 

On June 20, 1935, he got approved the De Vecchi reform, a bill of law which abolished the distinction between high schools depending from the central government and secondary schools that could be financed by local comune and provinces. The control of the while high school education was centralized on the government who decided scholastic curriculums and applied censorship upon scholastic textbooks before and after their publication.

From 1939 to 1943 he was also president of the Italian Numismatic Institute.

From 1936 to 1941, De Vecchi acted as governor of the Italian Aegean Islands promoting the official use of the Italian language. In the following year he was appointed to the Grand Council of Fascism and on 25 July 1943, he voted in favour of Dino Grandi's order of the day which deposed Benito Mussolini of his role as Fascist Duce (leader). On 1 August 1943 the was promoted to Generale di Divisione and given command of the newly forming 215th Coastal Division in Florence. After the announcement of the Armistice of Cassibile on 8 September 1943 De Vecchi authorized German forces to enter the port of Piombino and forbade any act of resistance. Nevertheless, units of the Royal Italian Navy and Royal Italian Army supported by the local population prevented the Germans from landing at Piombino and killed about 100 and captured over 200 Wehrmacht soldiers. The following day De Vecchi ordered to free the Germans and return their weapons to them, after which he signed the surrender of his Division to the Germans. On 13 September De Vecchi with pass given to him by German field marshal Albert Kesselring left his positions and took refuge in Piedmont.

In early October 1943 De Vecchi went into hiding with the help of the order of the Salesians of Don Bosco, who hid him from Mussolini's Italian Social Republic (Repubblica Sociale Italiana, or RSI), which condemned De Vecchi to death in absentia in the Verona trial in January 1944. The Salesians hid De Vecchi even after the war until 1947 when he escaped to Argentina on a Paraguayan passport.

After returning to Italy in 1949, De Vecchi supported the neo-fascist Italian Social Movement (Movimento Sociale Italiano, or MSI) together with Rodolfo Graziani.  However, he refused to accept any political or institutional office within the MSI.

Cesare Maria De Vecchi died in Rome in 1959.

Notes

References
 This article originated as a translation of its counterpart in the Italian Wikipedia as retrieved on 2007-03-18

1884 births
1959 deaths
Counts of Italy
Italian monarchists
Italian military personnel of World War I
People from Casale Monferrato
Members of the Grand Council of Fascism
Education ministers of Italy
Mussolini Cabinet
Deputies of Legislature XXVI of the Kingdom of Italy
Members of the Senate of the Kingdom of Italy
Governors of Italian Somaliland
People of former Italian colonies
Dodecanese under Italian rule
People sentenced to death in absentia
Exiled Italian politicians